The whitebeams are members of the family Rosaceae, comprising subgenus Aria (or, according to some authorities, its own genus) of genus Sorbus, and hybrids involving species of this subgenus and members of subgenera Sorbus, Torminaria and Chamaemespilus. They are deciduous trees with simple or lobed leaves, arranged alternately. They are related to the rowans (Sorbus subgenus Sorbus), and many of the endemic restricted-range apomictic microspecies of whitebeam in Europe are thought to derive from hybrids between S. aria and the European rowan S. aucuparia; some are also thought to be hybrids with the wild service tree S. torminalis, notably the service tree of Fontainebleau Sorbus latifolia in French woodlands.

Appearance
The surface of the leaf is an unremarkable mid-green, but the underside is almost white (hence the name) transforming the appearance of the tree in strong winds, as noted by the poet Meredith: "flashing as in gusts the sudden-lighted whitebeam". It is also described as the "wind-beat whitebeam" in Gerard Manley Hopkins' poem "The Starlight Night".

Ecology
The berries are a favourite of birds, though less palatable (drier, less juicy) than rowan berries. Whitebeams are sometimes used as larval food plants by Lepidoptera species, including the short-cloaked moth.

Uses

These trees are often grown in parks and large gardens. The cultivars S. aria 'Lutescens' and S. aria 'Majestica' have gained the Royal Horticultural Society's Award of Garden Merit.

The tough, hard wood is a deep orange when wet, and pale yellow after drying.

The fruit (a pome) is edible and is often made into jelly.

Classification

 section Aria - Sorbus aria and its close relatives
 section Alnifoliae - a group of Asian species
 section Thibeticae - a group of species from the Himalayas and southern China
 Sorbus intermedia group (nothosubgenus Soraria) - taxa of hybrid origin involving sections Aria and Sorbus
 Sorbus latifolia group (nothosubgenus Tormaria) - taxa of hybrid origin involving sections Aria and Torminaria

Selected species

Sorbus subgenus Aria
Sorbus admonitor - No parking whitebeam
Sorbus alnifolia - Korean whitebeam
Sorbus anglica - English whitebeam
Sorbus aria - Common Whitebeam
Sorbus aronioides - Chokeberry-leaved whitebeam
Sorbus arranensis - Arran whitebeam
Sorbus austriaca
Sorbus bristoliensis - Bristol Gorge whitebeam
Sorbus cambrensis - Welsh whitebeam
Sorbus carpatica - Carpathian whitebeam
Sorbus cheddarensis - Cheddar whitebeam
Sorbus croceocarpa - Orange whitebeam
Sorbus cuneifolia - Llangollen whitebeam
Sorbus danubialis
Sorbus decipiens - Sharp-toothed whitebeam
Sorbus devoniensis - Devon whitebeam
Sorbus eminens - Round-leaved whitebeam
Sorbus eminentiformis - Doward whitebeam
Sorbus eminentoides - Twin Cliffs whitebeam
Sorbus folgneri - Folgner's whitebeam
Sorbus franconica
Sorbus graeca - Balkan whitebeam
Sorbus hemsleyi
Sorbus hibernica - Irish whitebeam
Sorbus hybrida - Finnish whitebeam, Swedish service-tree
Sorbus intermedia - Swedish whitebeam
Sorbus lancastriensis - Lancastrian whitebeam
Sorbus latifolia - Service tree of Fontainebleau
Sorbus leighensis - Leigh Woods whitebeam
Sorbus leptophylla - Thin-leaved whitebeam
Sorbus leyana - Ley's whitebeam
Sorbus margaretae - Margaret's whitebeam
Sorbus minima - Least whitebeam
Sorbus mougeotii - Vosges whitebeam
Sorbus parviloba - Ship Rock whitebeam
Sorbus porrigentiformis - Grey-leaved whitebeam
Sorbus pseudofennica - Arran service tree
Sorbus pseudomeinichii - False rowan
Sorbus rupicola - Rock whitebeam
Sorbus rupicoloides - Gough's Rock whitebeam
Sorbus saxicola - Symonds Yat whitebeam
Sorbus scannelliana - Scannell's whitebeam
Sorbus stenophylla - Llanthony whitebeam
Sorbus stirtoniana - Stirton's whitebeam
Sorbus subcuneata - Somerset whitebeam
Sorbus thibetica - Tibetan whitebeam
Sorbus umbellata
Sorbus vestita - Himalayan whitebeam
Sorbus vexans - Bloody whitebeam
Sorbus whiteana - White's whitebeam
Sorbus wilmottiana - Wilmott's whitebeam
Plus many other species
Sorbus subgenus Sorbus
Sorbus Other subgenera

References 

Sorbus